Jean-Armel Kana-Biyik (born 3 July 1989) is a professional footballer who plays as a defender. Born in France, he represented Cameroon at international level.

Club career 
Kana-Biyik began his career at Le Havre in 2005 and was promoted to the first team in 2008, he made his debut on 22 February 2008 against Dijon in Ligue 2. On 21 June 2010, Kana-Biyik signed a four-year-deal with Rennes. He joined Toulouse on 10 January 2015 on a two and a half year contract.

In August 2016, Kana-Biyik left Toulouse to join Süper Lig side Kayserispor. Kana-Biyik had made over 150 Ligue 1 appearances before moving to Turkey.

In July 2019, Kana-Biyik joined Gazişehir Gaziantep. In January 2022, he signed for his hometown club Metz.

International career
Kana-Biyik was a former member of the France under-21 team. In 2012 decided to play for Cameroon at senior level. He retired from international duty with Cameroon in September 2019, having made 6 appearances.

Personal life
He is the son of André Kana-Biyik.

Honours
Le Havre

 Ligue 2: 2007–08

References

External links
 
 
 
 
 
 
 

1989 births
Living people
Footballers from Metz
Association football defenders
Cameroonian footballers
Cameroon international footballers
French footballers
French sportspeople of Cameroonian descent
Citizens of Cameroon through descent
France under-21 international footballers
Le Havre AC players
Stade Rennais F.C. players
Toulouse FC players
Kayserispor footballers
FC Metz players
Ligue 1 players
Ligue 2 players
Süper Lig players
Expatriate footballers in Turkey
2019 Africa Cup of Nations players
French expatriate sportspeople in Turkey
Cameroonian expatriate sportspeople in Turkey
Cameroonian expatriate footballers
French expatriate footballers